Chris G. Sibley is a Professor in the School of Psychology at the University of Auckland and the lead investigator for the New Zealand Attitudes and Values Study. Sibley's research focuses on understanding how people's connections with others around them interact with environmental and economic factors to cause change in personality, political attitudes, social values and psychological health over time. In 2014 he was the recipient of the Erik Erikson Award for Early Career Achievement, awarded by the International Society of Political Psychology. Sibley is also the editor of the Cambridge Handbook of the Psychology of Prejudice, and one of the developers of the Multi-dimensional model of Maori identity and cultural engagement.

Career 
His laboratory runs a 20-year longitudinal national probability study of social attitudes, personality and health outcomes. The NZAVS has been central in answering a variety of important research questions, and has published research about religion and the Christchurch earthquakes, Māori identity and wellbeing, as well as sexism, racism and personality in New Zealand.

Life 
Sibley grew up in Wainuiomata and Lower Hutt, where he attended Naenae College. He began his undergraduate study at Victoria University of Wellington in 1997 and completed his PhD in 2005. He has lived in Auckland since 2006, is an avid reader of science fiction novels and a keen hiker.

Awards 
 2014 Erik Erikson Award for Early Career Achievement, International Society of Political Psychology
 2011 Listed as a ‘Rising Star’ by the Association for Psychological Science
 2010 Early Career Research Excellence Award from the University of Auckland

Peer-reviewed publications 

 Sibley, C. G., & Osborne, D. (2016). Ideology and Post-Colonial Society. Political Psychology, 37, 115-161. doi: 10.1111/pops.12323 
 Shaver, J. H., Troughton, G., Sibley, C. G., & Bulbulia, J. A. (2016). Religion and the Unmaking of Prejudice toward Muslims: Evidence from a Large National Sample. PLoS ONE, 11 (3) doi: 10.1371/journal.pone.0150209
 Dawtry, R. J., Sutton, R. M., & Sibley, C. G. (2015). Why Wealthier People Think People Are Wealthier, and Why It Matters: From Social Sampling to Attitudes to Redistribution. Psychological Science, 26 (9), 1389-1400. doi: 10.1177/0956797615586560
 Houkamau, C. A., & Sibley, C. G. (2015). The Revised Multidimensional Model of Māori Identity and Cultural Engagement (MMM-ICE2). Social Indicators Research, 122 (1), 279-296. doi: 10.1007/s11205-014-0686-7

References 

Academic staff of the University of Auckland
Year of birth missing (living people)
Victoria University of Wellington alumni
People educated at Naenae College
Living people